Plainview is an unincorporated community in Harrison Township, White County, Arkansas, United States. It is located at the intersection of Arkansas Highway 157 and the northern terminus of Arkansas Highway 385.

References

Unincorporated communities in White County, Arkansas
Unincorporated communities in Arkansas